Aniss El Hriti (born 28 July 1989) is a French professional footballer who plays as a left-back for Championnat National club Red Star.

Career
Born in Paris, El Hriti is part of the talents of the Paris region and spent his formative years playing football in the  divisions of France, and played First Division Futsal at Garges Djibson with Wissam Ben Yedder. He signed his first professional contract with Tours FC on 7 August 2017. He made his professional debut with Tours in a 1–0 Ligue 2 loss to Reims on 11 August 2017 at the age of 28.

Personal life
El Hriti is of Moroccan, and Algerian descent.

References

External links
 
 FranceFootball Profile
 
 

1989 births
Living people
French sportspeople of Moroccan descent
French sportspeople of Algerian descent
French footballers
Footballers from Paris
Association football defenders
Tours FC players
FC Gueugnon players
SAS Épinal players
F91 Dudelange players
FC Chambly Oise players
Red Star F.C. players
Ligue 2 players
Championnat National players
Championnat National 2 players
Championnat National 3 players